Darbar Baba Nu Lakh Hazari is a Sufi shrine situated in the city of Shahkot in the Nankana Sahib District, in Punjab,Pakistan. 

The shrine was built in the 12th century to honor Abu Alkhair Syed Murad Ali Shah Bukhari also known as  Noulakha, who came to the Shahkot area in the 12th century to spread Islam in the subcontinent of India. "Nau lakh" is the Punjabi phrase for "nine hundred thousands". Noulakha received this name as it is believed by the people in the area  that during his lifetime, he recited the Quran nine hundred thousand times.

There is a mountain near the shrine. Every year on 23 March, there is a gathering to celebrate the Urs (death anniversary) of Baba Nu Lakh Hazari.

References

Punjabi Sufi saints
Sufi shrines in Pakistan
Sufism in Pakistan